CGS Joy Bangla is a  inshore patrol vessel of the Bangladesh Coast Guard. The ship is undergoing sea trials.

Career
The ship was laid down on 12 December 2017. She was handed over to the Bangladesh Coast Guard on 10 January 2022.

Design
She can carry out operations in sea state four and can sustain up to sea state six.

Armament
The ship is armed with two Oerlikon KBA 25 mm guns and two 14.5 mm guns.

See also
 List of ships of the Bangladesh Coast Guard

References

2022 ships
Ships of the Bangladesh Coast Guard
Apurbo Bangla class IPV
Ships built at Dockyard and Engineering Works Limited